Screamer Rally is the third game in the Screamer series, released in 1997, and the last to be developed by Milestone. The game builds on Screamer 2, but changes context to a rallying game. The game made use of 3dfx Voodoo Graphics chipset, allowing the game's graphics hardware acceleration access to high resolution and texture filtering. The game includes seven tracks, one each in China, Canada, Italy, Arizona, Sweden and Wales, with the addition of a bonus course. A sequel, Screamer 4x4, was released in 2000.

Reception

References

External links

1997 video games
DOS games
DOS-only games
Milestone srl games
Multiplayer and single-player video games
Racing video games set in the United States
Rally racing video games
Video games developed in Italy
Video games set in Arizona
Video games set in Canada
Video games set in China
Video games set in Italy
Video games set in Sweden
Video games set in Wales
Virgin Interactive games